Ralph Townsend (December 28, 1921 – May 27, 1988) was an American cross-country skier. He competed in the men's 18 kilometre event at the 1948 Winter Olympics.

References

1921 births
1988 deaths
American male cross-country skiers
American male Nordic combined skiers
Olympic cross-country skiers of the United States
Olympic Nordic combined skiers of the United States
Cross-country skiers at the 1948 Winter Olympics
Nordic combined skiers at the 1948 Winter Olympics
People from Lebanon, New Hampshire